refers to a version of Japanese that is easy to understand for children and foreigners who are unfamiliar with the Japanese language by using simple expressions, simplified sentence structure, and added furigana (kana indicating pronunciation) to kanji.

"Easy Japanese" for natural disaster mitigation 
In the Great Hanshin-Awaji Earthquake of 1995, many foreign residents were affected by the disaster as the Japanese were. According to subsequent surveys, they had more difficulty due to their inability to understand information about evacuation centers and lifelines. The native languages of foreign residents in Japan vary widely, and it is very difficult to immediately translate the information into multiple languages when a disaster strikes.

Facing this issue, Kazuyuki Sato and his colleagues at Hirosaki University researched and devised Easy Japanese, a concise and well-defined variation of Japanese that could be easily understood by people at the former Level 3 of the Japanese Language Proficiency Test (incorporating grammar learned in the 3rd-grade elementary school). In March 1999, the Hirosaki University Sociolinguistics Laboratory website published the Manual for Helping Foreigners in the Event of a Disaster (Hirosaki Edition), a collection of specific suggestions and maps for communicating about disasters and evacuations in Easy Japanese. This manual can be used anywhere in Japan by replacing some parts, such as place names. It was expanded and revised in 2005 and 2013 to include information on planned power outages and calls for water conservation.

In addition, a pamphlet explaining Easy Japanese and guidelines for creating the pamphlet are available free of charge for downloading and printing. In 2016, the Dictionary of Easy Japanese Terms was created and made available free of charge. It contains approximately 7,600 words relevant to daily life information in situations after a disaster occurs.

"Easy Japanese" as a common language 
As of December 2019, the number of foreign residents in Japan has more than tripled since 30 years ago. According to a nationwide survey conducted in 2008 by the National Center for Japanese Language Education and Information of the National Institute for Japanese Language and Linguistics(NINJAL), targeting foreign residents on “Japanese for daily life,” 62.6% of the respondents chose Japanese as the language they have no trouble with in their daily life, while 44.0% chose English.

The research group led by Isao Iori views compensatory education as necessary for foreign immigrants who will become indispensable for supporting Japanese society in the future. They also advocate that instead of forcing foreigners to learn Japanese, Japan should use Easy Japanese as a minimum common language during the immigrants' adjustment process.

In 2010, Nihongo Koredake (Just This Much Japanese) was published as a textbook for local Japanese language classes. The authors have been giving lectures and workshops in various places. In August 2020, the Immigration Services Agency of Japan and the Agency for Cultural Affairs published Guidelines for Resident Support in Easy Japanese. This is a guideline that focuses primarily on the written Easy Japanese.

Ten tips for practicing Easy Japanese in the medical field have been introduced:

 Organize your thoughts before speaking.
 Keep sentences short and use clear word endings to separate sentences (end sentences with desu or masu).
 Avoid honorific forms (sonkeigo) and humble forms (kenjōgo). Use polite forms (teineigo) instead.
 Do not prefix words with "o" (to the extent possible).
 Use native Japanese words rather than Sino-Japanese words (words of Chinese origin).
 Avoid excessive use of foreign loanwords.
 Rephrase expressions to increase the chance of their comprehension.
 Use gestures and actual objects.
 Do not use onomatopoeia.
 Do not use Easy Japanese when speaking with a person with a high fluency in Japanese because it can be seen as rude .

References 

Wikipedia Student Program
Japanese language
Languages of Japan
Language policy in Japan
Linguistic morphology
Language education in Japan
Simplified languages